Air Commodore Roderick Aeneas Chisholm,  (23 November 1911 – 7 December 1994) was a British night fighter pilot, flying ace—a title awarded to a pilot credited with shooting down at least five enemy aircraft in aerial combat—and a highly decorated British airman of the Second World War. As a Beaufighter night-fighter pilot between 13 March and 9 July 1941, he was credited with seven aerial victories, one probable and one damaged.

Chisholm had been a night fighter pilot with No. 604 Squadron RAF, flying the Bristol Beaufighter. During the war, he had been credited with seven night aerial victories, one probable and one damaged in 1941. Following a rest period, he returned to operations briefly in 1943 ending his combat career with nine victories. Chisholm championed radar-equipped night fighter intruder operations over Europe to apply pressure to the German air defence system and reduce losses to Bomber Command. He was appointed to the staff of a new organisation, named No. 100 Group RAF, created in 1943 for this purpose. As second in command of 100 Group from November 1943, his mission in Germany at the end of the war was to gather any useful information on enemy tactics and technology. He later wrote a book about his experiences entitled Cover of Darkness, published in 1953.

References
Citations

Bibliography

External links

1911 births
1994 deaths
People from Bridge of Allan
People educated at Ampleforth College
Alumni of Imperial College London
British World War II flying aces
Scottish flying aces
Commanders of the Order of the British Empire
Companions of the Distinguished Service Order
Recipients of the Distinguished Flying Cross (United Kingdom)
Royal Air Force officers
Royal Air Force pilots of World War II